The Klip River is a main tributary of the Tugela River in KwaZulu-Natal, South Africa. The river originates on the west side of KwaZulu-Natal, initially flows eastward and then swings southward. It flows into the Windsor Dam, and then into the larger Qedusizi Dam before flowing east again. The river passes through Ladysmith before joining the Tugela River.

For a brief period in the mid-19th century, a Klip River Republic was declared in the area by Boer settlers, before being annexed by the British.

References 
 South Africa Road Atlas. MapStudio. 

Rivers of KwaZulu-Natal
Former republics